Rav van den Berg (born 7 July 2004) is a Dutch professional footballer who plays as a centre-back for Eerste Divisie club PEC Zwolle. He is the brother of fellow footballer Sepp van den Berg.

Club career
Van den Berg started his career at PEC Zwolle after graduating through their academy and was linked with transfers to Ajax and PSV in March 2019, aged 14. He was included in a first team training camp in Spain midway through the 2019–20 season, aged 15, before signing a two-year contract with the club in May 2020. He made his first-team debut for the club on 1 May 2021, starting in a 2–1 Eredivisie defeat to SBV Vitesse at the age of 16 years and 298 days.

International career
He has represented the Netherlands internationally at under-15 and under-16 levels.

Personal life
He is the younger brother of Liverpool defender Sepp van den Berg, who also graduated through PEC Zwolle's academy before becoming their youngest debutant at the age of 16 years and 81 days in 2018.

References

External links

2004 births
Living people
Dutch footballers
Association football defenders
PEC Zwolle players
Eredivisie players
Netherlands youth international footballers